Azizan bin Abdul Razak (25 October 1944 – 26 September 2013) was a Malaysian politician who served as the 10th Menteri Besar (Chief Minister) of the state of Kedah from 2008 to 2013. A member of the Pan-Malaysian Islamic Party (PAS), he was the first Chief Minister of Kedah from a party other than the United Malays National Organisation (UMNO). He held the seat of Sungai Limau in the Kedah state assembly from 2004 until his death in 2013. He was also the state commissioner for PAS in Kedah and a member of the central committee of the national party.

Political career
Azizan was elected to the State Assembly of Kedah in 2004, for the seat of Sungai Limau. In 2008 his Parti Islam Se-Malaysia (PAS) was elected to government in Kedah, leading a coalition with the People's Justice Party (PKR) and the Democratic Action Party (DAP). 

Azizan, as the leader of PAS in the state, became the first chief minister of Kedah from a party other than the United Malays National Organisation (UMNO); the 2008 victory broke a decades-long run of uninterrupted UMNO rule. On 16 July 2008, he was conferred the Darjah Seri Paduka Mahkota Kedah (SPMK) which carried the "Datuk Seri" title. The award was presented by Sultan Abdul Halim Muadzam Shah at Istana Anak Bukit in conjunction with the sultan's Golden Jubilee celebration.

His tenure as chief minister came to an end at the 2013 election, as UMNO, led by Mukhriz Mahathir, the son of the former Prime Minister Mahathir Mohamad, won a majority in the assembly.

Personal life
Azizan had 14 children from two marriages. He is a graduate of Al-Azhar University and the University of Kent, and a former head of the sharia law department of the National University of Malaysia. He conversed fluently in Malay, English, and Arabic.

Death
Azizan died on 26 September 2013 at the Sultanah Bahiyah Hospital's intensive care unit due to weakening health. He was 68 years old.

Electoral history

2013: Kedah State Assembly - Sungai Limau
 Azizan Abdul Razak (PAS) 13,294
 Mohd Fazillah Mohd Ali (BN) 10,520
 Sobri Ahmad (BEBAS) 100
 Abdullah Hashim (BEBAS) 84

Majority:2,774

2008: Kedah State Assembly - Sungai Limau
 Azizan Abdul Razak (PAS) 12,028
 Basorri Abu Hassan (BN) 8,816

Majority:3,212

2004: Kedah State Assembly - Sungai Limau
 Azizan Abdul Razak (PAS) 10,882
 Suhaimi Abdullah (BN) 9,802

Majority:1,080

Honours

Honours of Malaysia
  :
  Commander of the Order of Loyalty to the Crown of Malaysia (PSM) – Tan Sri (2013)
  :
  Knight Grand Commander of the Exalted Order of the Crown of Kedah (SPMK) – Dato' Seri (2008)
  Grand Commander of the Order of Loyalty to Sultan Abdul Halim Mu'adzam Shah (SHMS) – Dato' Seri Diraja (2011)

References

Malaysian people of Malay descent
Malaysian Muslims
Chief Ministers of Kedah
Academic staff of the National University of Malaysia
National University of Malaysia alumni
Alumni of the University of Kent
Al-Azhar University alumni
1944 births
2013 deaths
People from Kedah
Malaysian Islamic Party politicians
Members of the Kedah State Legislative Assembly
Kedah state executive councillors
Commanders of the Order of Loyalty to the Crown of Malaysia
Malaysian expatriates in Egypt